Bishop of Moosonee can refer to:
 Roman Catholic Bishop of Moosonee
 Anglican Bishop of Moosonee